Pentapetes is a genus of flowering plants in the family Malvaceae. It contains a single species, Pentapetes phoenicea, called the noon flower and occasionally cultivated. The flower is also known as "Midday Flower" or "Scarlet Mallow". This is so named as the flowers open around noon, and closes around next day early morning.

The plant grows around 4–6 ft in height and the branches are long and spreading. Leaves are 6–10 cm in length, toothed at the margins, usually having a broad base and tapering to a pointed tip. Flowers are born in the axils of the leaves with 5 large deep red colored petals.  The fruit is a 5-valved, rounded, hairy capsule, about 1 centimetre in diameter. The seeds, which are not winged, occur 8–12 in two series in each cell.

The flower is native to a wide region of tropical South Asia from Ceylon and India to northern Australia and the Philippines.

References

Dombeyoideae
Malvaceae genera
Monotypic Malvales genera